2010 World Ice Hockey Championships may refer to:
 2010 Men's World Ice Hockey Championships
 2010 World Junior Ice Hockey Championships
 2010 IIHF World U18 Championships